Coupland is a city in southeastern Williamson County, Texas, United States. According to the 2019 Population Estimate of the United States Census, the population was 317.

Coupland's athletic teams are the "Cowboys." The Coupland Independent School District serves area students. Coupland ISD serves grades K–8. Upon graduation, the students go to Elgin, Texas, Pflugerville, Texas or Taylor, Texas for high school courses.

History

In 1859, Morgan C. Hamilton bought large tracts of land along Brushy Creek from Shiloh to Rice's Crossing.  Hamilton died in 1883, willing the land to his nephew, Theodore Van Buren Coupland.  Mr. Coupland sold a 100-foot right-of-way to the Taylor, Bastrop and Austin Railroad in 1887.  Two Taylor men subsequently formed the Coupland City Corporation to subdivide and sell land for the newly formed  unincorporated community of Coupland.

Coupland residents voted overwhelmingly to incorporate on November 6, 2012, the 125th anniversary of its founding. The City of Coupland held its first City Council elections on May 13, 2013, with Jack Piper running unopposed for mayor.

Geography

Coupland is located at  (30.456924, –97.392367), which is just south of the city of Taylor, just east of the city of Pflugerville and north of the city of Manor.

According to the United States Census Bureau, the city has a total land area of 1.926 square miles (4.989 km) and a total water area of 0.026 square miles (0.067 km).

Demographics

References

External links
 Coupland Civic Organization
 
 

Cities in Texas
Cities in Williamson County, Texas
Greater Austin
Populated places established in 2012